Saurs may refer to:
 Bruce Saurs (died 2014), former owner of American ice-hockey team Peoria Rivermen (IHL)
 Château de Saurs, French vineyard
 Gineste de Saurs, family of French wine-producers

See also
 Saur (disambiguation)